Giant four o'clock is a common name for several plants and may refer to:

Mirabilis gigantea
Mirabilis multiflora

References